The 22nd century is a century of the Christian or Common Era, which runs from 2101 through 2200.

22nd century may also refer to:

 22nd century BC
 22nd Century (band), a Canadian rock band
 "22nd Century", a song by Exuma from his 1971 album Do Wah Nanny
 22nd Century Media, an American media company

See also